

Review and events

Monthly events
This is a list of the significant events to occur at the club during the 2010–11 season, presented in chronological order. This list does not include transfers, which are listed in the transfers section below, or match results, which are in the results section.

June:

July:

August:

April: Preston North End are relegated to League One after a 1–0 defeat to Cardiff City.

Squad details

Players info

Matches

Championship

FA Cup

League Cup

Championship data

Results summary

Season statistics

Starts and goals

|}
Notes: Player substitutions are not included.

Goalscorers

Yellow cards

Red cards

Penalties awarded

Monthly and weekly awards

End-of-season awards

Overall

Transfers

Transfers in

Transfers out

Loans in

Loans out

Kit profile

|
|
|}

References

External links
 Official Site: 2010/2011 Fixtures & Results
 BBC Sport – Club Stats
 Soccerbase – Results | Squad Stats | Transfers

Preston North End
Preston North End F.C. seasons